There are a number of memorials to alleged UFOs

UFO-Memorial Ängelholm in Sweden
Emilcin UFO memorial in Poland
Robert Taylor incident#Ufologists, a plaque in Livingston, Scotland